Charlotte Bacon (1801–1880) was an English aristocrat, muse to Lord Byron, and namesake of Charlotte Waters, Northern Territory.

Charlotte Bacon may also refer to:

Charlotte Bacon (author), American author, published short story collection A Private State
Charlotte Bacon (shooting victim) (2006–2012), victim in the Sandy Hook Elementary School shooting
Charlotte Bacon, wife of homeopath George Napoleon Epps